Stephane Bouquet (born 1968) is a French writer, screenwriter and critic.

Filmography

As screenwriter
 1996 : Il faut que je l'aime
 1998 : Les Corps ouverts
 1999 : Les Terres froides
 2000 : Presque rien
 2001 : La Traversée
 2002 : La défaite du rouge-gorge
 2002 : Le pays du chien qui chante
 2004 : Wild Side
 2005 : Torse
 2009 : Going South

As actor
 2011 : Iris in Bloom

References

External links

 

1968 births
Living people
French male screenwriters
Writers from Paris